Marcílio da Silva Miguel (born 10 August 1995), known as Marcílio, is a Brazilian football player who plays for Esporte Clube Primavera.

Club career
He made his professional debut in the Campeonato Brasileiro Série B for ABC on 28 May 2013 in a game against Sport Recife.

References

External links

1995 births
People from Natal, Rio Grande do Norte
Living people
Brazilian footballers
Brazilian expatriate footballers
ABC Futebol Clube players
Mirassol Futebol Clube players
S.C. Covilhã players
Botafogo Futebol Clube (PB) players
Vitória S.C. B players
Renofa Yamaguchi FC players
Guarani FC players
Liga Portugal 2 players
J2 League players
Campeonato Brasileiro Série B players
Campeonato Brasileiro Série C players
Association football fullbacks
Brazilian expatriate sportspeople in Portugal
Brazilian expatriate sportspeople in Japan
Expatriate footballers in Portugal
Expatriate footballers in Japan
Sportspeople from Rio Grande do Norte